Comben is a surname. Notable people with the surname include:

Aubrey Comben (1904–1972), Australian rules footballer
Bruce Comben (1930–2002), Australian rules footballer 
John Comben (born 1944), Australian rules footballer
Pat Comben (born 1950), Australian politician
Robert Stone Comben (1868–1957), British politician